The 13 centimeter, 2.3 GHz or 2.4 GHz band is a portion of the UHF (microwave) radio spectrum internationally allocated to amateur radio and amateur satellite use on a secondary basis. The amateur radio band is between 2300 MHz and 2450 MHz, and thereby inside the S-band. The amateur satellite band is between 2400 MHz and 2450 MHz, and its use by satellite operations is on a non-interference basis to other radio users (ITU footnote 5.282). The license privileges of amateur radio operators include the use of frequencies and a wide variety of modes within these ranges for telecommunication. The allocations are the same in all three ITU Regions.

The band is also allocated to the Mobile service in the 2300–2400 MHz range on a Primary basis, which in practice creates some difficult sharing scenarios and erratic amateur allocations at the national level.

Above 2400 MHz the band overlaps with the 2.4 GHz ISM (industrial, scientific, and medical) band, and amateur stations must accept harmful interference caused by ISM equipment operating in the band, such as microwave ovens.  The ISM band is also used by unlicensed devices, such as Wi-Fi and Bluetooth, which must not cause interference to amateur stations.

History

List of notable frequencies 

2,304.1 MHz  Region 2 CW & SSB calling frequency
2,320.2 MHz  Region 1 Narrow-band calling frequency
2.400–2.485 GHz: Spread Spectrum band for general radio-controlled aircraft recreational use (amateur radio license holders have 2.39–2.45 GHz licensed for their general use in the USA) and using both frequency-hopping spread spectrum and direct-sequence spread spectrum RF technology to maximize the number of available frequencies on this band, especially at organized events in North America.
2,450 MHz  Operating frequency of ISM devices.

United States
In the United States, the 13 cm band comprises frequencies in two segments stretching from 2.300 to 2.310 GHz, and from 2.390 to 2.450 GHz. (The segment from 2.310 to 2.390 GHz was withdrawn from the amateur service and reallocated to direct satellite radio broadcasting, e.g., Sirius XM Radio.)  The segment, 2.390 to 2.417 GHz, is domestically allocated amateur radio on a primary basis, while the remainder of the band is only available on a secondary basis.  It is authorized to all amateur radio licensees who hold a  Technician or higher class license (US), or a Basic or higher license (Canada). The band is allocated on a shared basis with other services, and U.S. Federal Communications Commission (FCC) Rules specify that amateurs may not cause interference to and must accept interference from other services authorized by other nations, and by radio-location, fixed, and mobile stations (except aeronautical) authorized by the FCC. As in the rest of the world, US stations in the amateur service are not protected from interference caused by industrial, scientific, and medical equipment.

The bandplan published by the American Radio Relay League recommends frequencies based on intended activity in the band.

See also 
 Amateur radio frequency allocations
 High-speed multimedia radio

References 

Amateur radio bands